"Unpredictable" is a song recorded by English singer Olly Murs for his fifth studio album, 24 Hrs (2016). It was written and produced by Cutfather, Daniel Davidsen and Peter Wallevik, with an additional writing from Kara DioGuardi and Iain James. Originally recorded as a solo version, it was edited by Matt Rad with additional vocals from English singer Louisa Johnson and was digitally released on 2 June 2017 in the United Kingdom. "Unpredictable" peaked at number 32 on the UK Singles Chart and was certified Silver by the British Phonographic Industry (BPI), denoting sales of over 200,000 units in that country. The accompanying music video for the single takes place in 1978 and features both artists playing tennis against each other.

Background
On 22 May 2017, Murs confirmed on his Twitter account that "Unpredictable" would be the fourth single from 24 Hrs.

Music video
The video for "Unpredictable" was released on 22 June 2017. It was filmed in Palm Springs and is set in 1978 and sees Murs and Johnson playing tennis against each other. As of September 15, 2018, it has over 6 million views on YouTube.

Credits and personnel

 Olly Murs – vocals
 Louisa Johnson – vocals
 Daniel Davidsen – writing, production, bass guitar, programming
 Cutfather – writing, production, percussion
 Peter Wallevik – writing, production, keyboards, piano, programming
 Kara DioGuardi – writing
 Iain James – writing
 Matt Rad – production, bass guitar, guitar, mixing, piano, programming
 Chris Gehringer – mastering

Credits adapted from the liner notes of the official "Unpredictable" CD single release (Columbia Records).

Charts

Certifications

Release history

References

2017 songs
2017 singles
Olly Murs songs
Louisa Johnson songs
Songs written by Cutfather
Songs written by Kara DioGuardi
Songs written by Iain James
Songs written by Daniel Davidsen
Songs written by Peter Wallevik
Epic Records singles
Male–female vocal duets